The 2013–14 season will be Episkopi 1st season in Football League.

They will also compete in the Greek Cup.

The club has made 11 appearances in the Delta Ethniki, where they have been playing continuously since 2003. In 2012, they were promoted to Football League 2 for the first time in their history as champions of Delta Ethniki's 10th Group.

Players

Current squad

Source=Episkopi FC Homepage

Pre-season and friendlies

Football League

League table

Results summary

Results by round

Matches

Greek Football Cup

First round

Statistics

Goal scorers

Source=Soccerway
Last updated: 26 October 2013

Disciplinary Record

Last Updated: 13 November 2013

References

Episkopi F.C. seasons
Episkopi